The 2002 Senior League World Series took place from August 11–17 in Bangor, Maine, United States. Willemstad, Curaçao defeated Boynton Beach, Florida in the championship game. 

In addition to being the first SLWS in Bangor; the double elimination format was replaced by round robin pool play.

Teams

Results

Group A

Group B

Elimination Round

References

Senior League World Series
Senior League World Series
Senior League